ASU Karsten Golf Course was a classic designed links-style golf course in Tempe, Arizona, located on the campus of Arizona State University. Designed by noted course architect Pete Dye, it opened for play in September 1989 and is the home venue of the Sun Devils golf teams.

Karsten Golf Course closed on May 5, 2019, in order to be developed into sports fields. ASU moved their golf course to the nearby Papago Golf Course after striking a 30-year management agreement with the City of Phoenix, Papago's owner.

Creation
Privately funded, the largest single contributor was Karsten Solheim (1911–2000), the founder of Phoenix-based PING golf clubs. The clubhouse and ASU players' facility
were completed in November 1994. It was located at the northeast edge of campus, east of Sun Devil Stadium.

History
The course was considered to many as the Home of Champions, referring to ASU's strong collegiate golf program's national titles; twice in men's (1990 and 1996) and seven times in women's (1990, 1993, 1994, 1995, 1997, 1998, 2009). Alumni among PGA and LPGA Tour professionals include Phil Mickelson, Jon Rahm, Billy Mayfair, Paul Casey, Howard Twitty, Tom Purtzer, Pat Perez, Matt Jones, Chez Reavie, JoAnne Carner, Heather Farr,  Grace Park, Azahara Muñoz, Anna Nordqvist, and Carlota Ciganda.

Awarded a high 4½ rating by Golf Digest Rating Panel, a number of holes were considered the course’s signature hole. The short par-four 4th hole, the tough par-four 9th, the dauntingly long par-three 16th ( from the tips) or the ill humor par-four 18th, guarded by water down the left side, was considered one of the toughest finishing holes in the state. The course hosted tournaments, including the collegiate Men’s and Women’s Pac-10 and NCAA Championships, Phoenix Thunderbirds Collegiate Invitational, PING Invitational, and U.S. Open Qualifying.

References

External links 
 Arizona State University – Tempe campus tour: Karsten Golf Course
 Weather.com – ASU Karsten Golf Course – conditions and forecast

Arizona State University
College golf clubs and courses in the United States
Golf clubs and courses in Arizona
Sports venues in Tempe, Arizona
Arizona State Sun Devils
2019 disestablishments in Arizona
Defunct golf clubs and courses